An Abendrealschule ("Evening Realschule") is a German class of secondary school for mature students, which allows them to gain the Mittlere Reife and sometimes also other school-leaving certificates. Classes are usually held in the evening.

See also 

Abendhauptschule
Abendgymnasium

References 

Education in Germany
School types
Adult education